The canton of Le Livradais is an administrative division of the Lot-et-Garonne department, southwestern France. It was created at the French canton reorganisation which came into effect in March 2015. Its seat is in Sainte-Livrade-sur-Lot.

It consists of the following communes:
 
Allez-et-Cazeneuve
Casseneuil
Dolmayrac
Fongrave
Monclar
Montastruc
Pinel-Hauterive
Sainte-Livrade-sur-Lot
Saint-Étienne-de-Fougères
Saint-Pastour
Le Temple-sur-Lot
Tombebœuf
Tourtrès
Villebramar

References

Cantons of Lot-et-Garonne